Kuwanouchi Dam  is a gravity dam located in Kumamoto Prefecture in Japan. The dam is used for power production. The catchment area of the dam is 215 km2. The dam impounds about 13  ha of land when full and can store 961 thousand cubic meters of water. The construction of the dam was started on 1925 and completed in 1955.

See also
List of dams in Japan

References

Dams in Kumamoto Prefecture